Judgment is an HBO television film. It was first broadcast on October 13, 1990, and was written and directed by Tom Topor. The film's tagline is "No one stands beyond the reach of the law, not even the Church."

Plot 
The sexual abuse of minors by priests is the delicate issue to be handled by Peter and Emmeline Guitry, devout Catholics in a small town in Louisiana whose lives are shattered when their son Robbie reveals that he has been sexually abused by their priest, Father Frank Aubert. Along with other parents in the parish, they begin a persistent but painful campaign to remove Aubert from the clergy, and have him prosecuted as a sex offender. The Catholic Church attempts to cover up the abuse and place Aubert back in the parish, causing a nationally publicized lawsuit.

Cast
Keith Carradine as Pete Guitry
Blythe Danner as Emmeline Guitry
Jack Warden as Claude Fortier
David Strathairn as Father Frank Aubert
Michael Faustino as Robbie Guitry
Crystal McKellar as Sabine Guitry
Bob Gunton as Monsignor Beauvais
Mitchell Ryan as Dave Davis
Robert Joy as Mr. Hummel
Steve Hofvendahl as Daniel Broussard
Mary Joy as Madeleine Broussard

Reception 

Washington Post movie critic Tom Shales called the film "a competent, compelling docudrama, but also one of those squirm-inducing films that seem, when it's all over, not worth the discomfort." Chris Willman of the Los Angeles Times wrote: "Ultimately “Judgment” stops a little short of the judgments it seems prepared to make..." The Baltimore Sun's Steve McKerrow concluded, "the film grapples pretty well with its troubling topic."

Kenneth R. Clark, writing in the Chicago Tribune, talked with the film's producer, Rob Hershman about the story's origins. In 1984 Hershman found a one paragraph newspaper summary of Louisiana priest Gilbert Gauthe's plea agreement and chose to cover the story on CBS News's "West 57th Street" program. Tom Topor, who had previously written about public rape in The Accused and about incestuous pedophilia in Nuts chose to write the screenplay about a fictional character similar to Gauthe and direct the project for HBO Films. Clark neither praised the film nor panned it, but pointed out "only HBO, with no advertisers to worry about and no public pressure groups to appease, would dare to run it."

Awards
The director and writer Tom Topor won the Writers Guild of America award for his work on Judgment.

References

External links 
 
 

1990 television films
1990 drama films
HBO Films films
Films scored by Cliff Eidelman
Films about Catholic priests
Films about child sexual abuse
Films about pedophilia